Spiny lizards is a common name for the genus Sceloporus in the family Phrynosomatidae.  The genus is endemic to North America, with various species ranging from New York, to Washington, and one occurring as far south as northern Panama. The greatest diversity is found in Mexico. This genus includes some of the most commonly seen lizards in the United States. Other common names for lizards in this genus include fence lizards, scaly lizards, bunchgrass lizards, and swifts.

Taxonomy
The 113 species in the genus Sceloporus are organized into 21 species groups. However, their relationships to each other are currently under review. Listed below are species of Sceloporus:

Species

Nota bene: A binomial authority in parentheses indicates that the species was originally described in a genus other than Sceloporus.

Sceloporus gallery

See also
Moloch horridus, an unrelated Australian lizard that is sometimes also referred to as "spiny lizard"

References

External links
Video of Sceloporus jarrovii in Arizona

Further reading
Boulenger GA (1885). Catalogue of the Lizards in the British Museum (Natural History). Second Edition. Volume II. Iguanidæ ... London: Trustees of the British Museum (Natural History). (Taylor and Francis, printers). xiii + 497 pp. + Plates I-XXIV. (Genus Sceloporus, p. 216).
Goin CJ, Goin OB, Zug GR (1978). Introduction to Herpetology, Third Edition. San Francisco: W.H. Freeman. xi + 378 pp. . (Genus Sceloporus, pp. 130, 291).
Köhler G, Heimes P (2002). Stachelleguane: Lebensweise, Pflege, Zucht [Spiny Lizards: Way of Life, Care, Breeding]. Offenbach, Germany: Herpeton, Verlag Elke Köhler. 174 pp. . (in German).
Powell R, Conant R, Collins JT (2016). Peterson Field Guide to Reptiles and Amphibians of Eastern and Central North America, Fourth Edition. Boston and New York: Houghton Mifflin Harcourt. xiv + 494 pp., 47 Plates, 207 Figures. . (Genus Sceloporus, p. 292).
Smith HM (1939). "The Mexican and Central American Lizards of the Genus Sceloporus ". Field Museum of Natural History, Zoological Series 26: 1–429.
Smith HM, Brodie ED Jr (1982). Reptiles of North America: A Guide to Field Identification. New York: Golden Press. 240 pp.  (paperback),  (hardcover). (Genus Sceloporus, p. 114-115).
Stebbins RC (2003). A Field Guide to Western Reptiles and Amphibians, Third Edition. The Peterson Field Guide Series ®. Boston and New York: Houghton Mifflin Company. xi + 533 pp. 56 plates, 39 figures. . (Genus Sceloporus, p. 283; Sceloporus species accounts, pp. 283–294).
Wiegmann AF (1828). "Beyträge zur Amphibienkunde ". Isis von Oken 21 (4): 364–383. (Sceloporus, new genus, p. 369). (in German and Latin).

Sceloporus
Taxa named by Arend Friedrich August Wiegmann